The Younger Generation is a 1929 American part-talkie drama film directed by Frank Capra and starring Ricardo Cortez.  It was produced by Jack Cohn for Columbia Pictures.  It was Capra's first sound film. While mostly silent, the film has talking sequences, as well as a synchronized music score and sound effects. The screenplay was adapted from a 1927 Fannie Hurst play, It Is to Laugh.

Plot
The child of Jewish immigrants, Morris Goldfish (Ricardo Cortez) finds success as an art dealer. He moves his family to Fifth Avenue and changes his name to Maurice Fish. There, he finds his family to be damaging to his social status.  In the end he finds that there is more to life than money.

Cast
 Jean Hersholt as Julius (Pa) Goldfish
 Lina Basquette as Birdie Goldfish
 Ricardo Cortez as Morris Goldfish
 Rex Lease as Eddie Lesser
 Rosa Rosanova as Tilda (Ma) Goldfish
 Syd Crossley as Goldfish's Butler
 Joe Bordeaux as Crook (uncredited)
 Ferike Boros as Delancey Street Woman (uncredited)
 Clarence Burton as Police Desk Sergeant (uncredited)
 Paul Ellis as Crook (uncredited)
 Otto Fries as Tradesman (uncredited)
 Julia Swayne Gordon as Mrs. Striker (uncredited)
 Donald Hall as Minor Role (uncredited)
 Leon Janney as Eddie Lesser as a Boy (uncredited)
 Julanne Johnston as Irma Striker (uncredited)
 Virginia Marshall as Birdie Goldfish as a girl (uncredited)
 Jack Raymond as Pinsky (uncredited)
 Bernard Siegel as Minor Role (uncredited)

References

External links

1929 films
American black-and-white films
Columbia Pictures films
1929 drama films
Films directed by Frank Capra
Transitional sound films
American drama films
Films with screenplays by Sonya Levien
Films based on works by Fannie Hurst
Early sound films
1920s English-language films
1920s American films